Evage, stylised as EVage, is an Indian electric vehicle automaker and automotive technology company based in Chandigarh, India.

History
Evage ventures was incorporated in 2014 by its founder and CEO Inderveer Singh. Evage has combined the logistics designing process with aerospace engineering to rethink and change the transportation industry. This has led to the creation of innovative products like a modular skateboard, which can be used to build different types of vehicles such as SUVs, vans, delivery and public transport vehicles and an exoskeleton covered with space-grade composite material that is both light and strong. Over the last eight years, the business has filed for twenty patents.

In January 2022, Evage Ventures raised $28 million from RedBlue Capital, a venture capital firm based in the US, to fund the completion of its production-ready factory in Chandigarh, Punjab, and plans to start operations in the financial year 2022-23 and scale its production capacity.

In October 2022, Evage partnered with Toshiba India to supply rechargeable lithium-ion cells for battery packs for EVage’s electric vans. This is the first time lithium titanium oxide (LTO) cells have been used in commercial delivery vans, allowing it to build the first million-mile battery with ultra stable chemistry that can be charged within 20 minutes.

Evage’s vehicles are manufactured in ‘Modular Miniature Manufacturing’ factories that are smaller and need less capital than traditional factories. Evage predicts that delivery companies across the globe will shift to cleaner mobility.

Product
FR8 is Evage's first electric vehicle, a one-tonne truck made for the commercial delivery vehicle market. The vehicle was initially developed under the codename Model.X and was later renamed FR8. It is an electric four-wheeler truck deployed on Indian roads by e-commerce and delivery companies such as Amazon and Delhivery. The product’s first prototype was built in 2019, and since then has been tested for over 500,000  km within three years. FR8 was established after research into mid and last-mile delivery in FMCG, e-commerce, and logistics.

References

Truck manufacturers of India
Electric vehicle manufacturers of India